Verkhneye Kazanishche is a rural locality (a selo) and the administrative centre of Verkhnekazanishchensky Selsoviet, Buynaksky District, Republic of Dagestan, Russia. The population was 6,573 as of 2010. There are 53 streets.

Geography
Verkhneye Kazanishche is located 13 km south of Buynaksk (the district's administrative centre) by road. Nizhneye Kazanishche is the nearest rural locality.

References 

Rural localities in Buynaksky District